Bruce Simpson (born March 6, 1950 in Toronto, Ontario) is a retired male pole vaulter from Canada. He set his personal best (5.38 metres) in the men's pole vault on 13 February 1976 at a meet in Toronto.

International competitions

1Representing the Americas

References
trackfield.brinkster

1950 births
Living people
Athletes from Toronto
Canadian male pole vaulters
Athletes (track and field) at the 1970 British Commonwealth Games
Athletes (track and field) at the 1971 Pan American Games
Athletes (track and field) at the 1972 Summer Olympics
Athletes (track and field) at the 1975 Pan American Games
Athletes (track and field) at the 1976 Summer Olympics
Athletes (track and field) at the 1978 Commonwealth Games
Athletes (track and field) at the 1979 Pan American Games
Athletes (track and field) at the 1982 Commonwealth Games
Olympic track and field athletes of Canada
Commonwealth Games gold medallists for Canada
Commonwealth Games medallists in athletics
Pan American Games gold medalists for Canada
Pan American Games silver medalists for Canada
Pan American Games bronze medalists for Canada
Pan American Games medalists in athletics (track and field)
Universiade medalists in athletics (track and field)
Universiade silver medalists for Canada
Medalists at the 1975 Summer Universiade
Medalists at the 1971 Pan American Games
Medalists at the 1975 Pan American Games
Medalists at the 1979 Pan American Games
20th-century Canadian people
21st-century Canadian people
Medallists at the 1978 Commonwealth Games